Downieville is a census-designated place in and the county seat of Sierra County, California, United States. The 2020 United States census reported Downieville's population was 290.

History

Gold was discovered here by Francis Anderson on September 14, 1849. Anderson had joined Phil A. Haven that same year along the North Yuba River.

Downieville was founded in late 1849 during the California Gold Rush, in the Northern Mines area. It was first known as "The Forks" for its geographical location at the confluence of the Downie River and North Fork of the Yuba River.

It was soon renamed after Major William Downie (1820-1893), the town's founder. Downie was a Scotsman who had led an expedition of nine miners, seven of them African American men, up the North Fork of the Yuba River in the Autumn of 1849. At the present site of the town they struck rich gold, built a log cabin, and settled in to wait out the winter. By 1850, Downieville had 15 hotels, 4 bakeries, 4 butcher shops, and numerous saloons.

Josefa Segovia, a young Californio resident of the town, was lynched by a mob on July 5, 1851. The lynch mob held a mock trial, and accused her of killing an American miner. The mock trial quickly led to hanging her from the Jersey Bridge in town. Segovia was the first and only hanging of a woman in the history of California.

In 1853 Downieville was vying to become the new state capital of California, along with fifteen other California communities to replace Vallejo. The capital was moved to Benicia for a year, and then in 1854 to Sacramento.

The Northern Mines area of the gold rush had a number of mining camps with colorful names, such as Brandy City (originally known as Strychnine City), Whiskey Diggins, Poverty Hill, Poker Flat, and Camptonville. Many of these camps disappeared after the gold rush or became ghost towns. Downieville had reached a peak population of over 5,000 people in 1851, but by 1865 had significantly declined. It survived due to its status as the county seat of government in Sierra County, and from its geographic location between Sacramento Valley and Tahoe region/Nevada destinations.

Demographics

The 2010 United States Census reported that Downieville had a population of 282. The racial makeup of Downieville was 269 (95%) White, 0 (0%) African American, 4 (1%) Native American, 2 (1%) Asian, 0 (0%) Pacific Islander, 0 (0%) from other races, and 7 (3%) from two or more races. Hispanic or Latino of any race were 12 persons (4%).

The Census reported that 282 people (100% of the population) lived in households, 0 (0%) lived in non-institutionalized group quarters, and 0 (0%) were institutionalized.

There were 147 households, out of which 25 (17%) had children under the age of 18 living in them, 59 (40%) were opposite-sex married couples living together, 13 (9%) had a female householder with no husband present, 4 (3%) had a male householder with no wife present. There were 6 (4%) unmarried opposite-sex partnerships, and 3 (2%) same-sex married couples or partnerships. 61 households (42%) were made up of individuals, and 32 (22%) had someone living alone who was 65 years of age or older. The average household size was 1.9. There were 76 families (52% of all households); the average family size was 2.6.

The population was spread out, with 40 people (14%) under the age of 18, 20 people (7%) aged 18 to 24, 42 people (15%) aged 25 to 44, 104 people (37%) aged 45 to 64, and 76 people (27%) who were 65 years of age or older. The median age was 56.5 years. For every 100 females, there were 104.3 males. For every 100 females age 18 and over, there were 106.8 males.

The homeowner vacancy rate was 4%; the rental vacancy rate was 15%. 198 people (70% of the population) lived in owner-occupied housing units and 84 people (30%) lived in rental housing units.

Government

Local
Because Loyalton is Sierra County's most populous municipality and its only incorporated city, generally half of the meetings of the county's board of supervisors are held in Downieville and the other half are held in Loyalton.

State and Federal

Recreation and tourism
Downieville is surrounded by the Yuba River District of the Tahoe National Forest. Popular outdoor recreation activities include fishing, mountain biking, back country "jeeping" and motorcycling, kayaking, hiking and nature walks, gold panning, and sites of the California Gold Rush. Fishing includes planted rainbow trout and German brown trout in the North Fork of the Yuba River.

Mountain biking
The town is a popular destination and central hub for mountain biking trails and events. The renowned "Downieville Downhill" singletrack trail has a  drop over its  length. There are shuttles to the trailhead available in town, which is its terminus. It includes long and narrow suspension footbridges across canyons and streams.

The town hosts the world-famous Downieville Classic mountain biking races, a two-day event with an Enduro style or Super-D downhill race, and an extremely challenging cross-country cycling race. In 2003 the Single Speed World Championship was held in Downieville.

Whitewater Rafting
The town of Downieville is the meeting location for many whitewater water rafting trips on the North Yuba River both privately and commercially.  Commercial rafting is done by multiple companies including Tributary Whitewater Tours and Raft California.

Downieville Museum
The Downieville Museum is in an 1852 stone building that was originally a general store, among other things, and was eventually donated to the city by its owner J.M.B. Meroux. With original iron doors and window shutters, it first housed a store that was built and operated by the Meroux family, whose gravestones are displayed prominently at the old Downieville cemetery. The museum displays local artifacts, historic items, pioneer portraits, and vintage photographs depicting the life of this community over 160 years, from its Gold Rush origins to the present day. It also displays a scale model of the turn-of-the-century Downieville business district and a replica of the  Sierra County gold collection, a duplicate of the gold specimens and gold bars from Sierra County mines that are on display in the Los Angeles County Museum of Natural History.

Lodging
There are a variety of lodging choices in Downieville and its surroundings; some are on the North Fork Yuba River. They include Forest Service campgrounds, motels, bed and breakfast inns, rental cabins and backcountry campsites.

E Clampus Vitus
Every year, during the final weekend of August, the brotherhood of the Ancient and Honorable Order of E Clampus Vitus, William Downie Chapter 1849, descend upon the town of Downieville for their annual "Tin Cup Doins;" a grand and noble tradition dating back to the gold rush days that celebrates the rich history and heritage of the town. The town of Downieville is often referred to as "the Cradle of Clamperdom," or the birthplace of the modern Order. Clampatriarch Adam Lee Moore is noted to be buried in the Downieville cemetery, who within Clamper Lore, is credited with resurrection of the order to its modern status as a historical society from its former days as a fraternal brotherhood amongst miners. Many of the bronze commemorative plaques that can be seen marking historical sites and artifacts throughout the town are rememberances bestowed by the modern ECV brethren; many of such plaques can be seen about numerous historical mining sites throughout the western United States.
St Charles Place, the local and last standing saloon in town, is an official ECV Watering Hole.

Notable people 

 Lewis Francis Byington, District Attorney of San Francisco
 Robert Lewis Byington, member of the California State Assembly
 Byington Ford, real estate developer and military officer
 Tirey L. Ford, 18th California Attorney General
 George E. Goodfellow, physician and naturalist who performed the first documented laparotomy 
 Warren Harding, climber and member of the first team to climb El Capitan, Yosemite Valley, in 1958
 Joseph C. McKibbin, lawyer and politician
 Frank M. Proctor, member of the Nevada Senate
 Josefa Segovia, victim of lynching in Downieville

Appearances in popular culture

Downieville was featured by Huell Howser in California's Gold Episode 212.

Services
Downieville has its own post office; the town's ZIP code is 95936.

Wired telephone numbers for the town follow the format (530) 289-xxxx.

Downieville is home to The Mountain Messenger weekly newspaper. The paper began in 1853 as a twice-per-month publication; its claim to fame is that Mark Twain once wrote there under his real name, Sam Clemens. It is distributed through the U.S. mail and includes subscribers far beyond Sierra County.

Geography
According to the United States Census Bureau, the CDP covers an area of 3.2 square miles (8.3 km), 99.83% of it land and 0.17% of it water. Most of the town is built on riverwash soils; higher locations are on Hurlbut gravelly loam or Deadwood gravelly sandy loam.

Climate
This region experiences warm (but not hot) and dry summers, with no average monthly temperatures above . According to the Köppen Climate Classification system, Downieville has a warm-summer Mediterranean climate, abbreviated Csb on climate maps.

Gallery

References

External links

 Sierra County website — Downieville is the county seat.
 Major Downie website — founder of Downieville.
 Sierra County chamber of commerce: History of Downieville
 Highway 49 information
 Tahoe National Forest — homepage + links
 Panorama of Downieville, Calif., ca. 1860-ca. 1870 — from The Bancroft Library.
 Eastman Originals Collection: historical images of Downieville — from the University of California, Davis; Special Collections Department: The Eastman Collection — online archives.

 
County seats in California
Census-designated places in Sierra County, California
Mining communities of the California Gold Rush
Populated places in the Sierra Nevada (United States)
Tahoe National Forest
Yuba River
1849 establishments in California
Populated places established in 1849
Census-designated places in California